This Weekend is a 2012 Indian Hindi-language thriller film directed by Tinu Verma and starring Arjun Sarja, Bianca Desai and Dhanya. This film was also partially reshot in Tamil (under the title Kaattu Puli) and Telugu. The film released on 17 February 2012.

Plot 
A family consisting of a father, Dr. Sanjay; a mother, Dr. Shivani; and their daughter, Anjali are having a picnic but get stuck in the forest. They are joined by three couples (played by Rajneesh Duggal and Sayali Bhagat, Hanaya and Amith, and Jahan and Jennifer).

Cast 
Arjun Sarja as Dr. Sanjay
Bianca Desai as Dr. Shivani
Dhanya as Anjali
Rajneesh Duggal as Ajay
Sayali Bhagat as Divya
Hananya
Amith
Jahan
Jennifer
Tinu Verma

Production 
Stunt director Tinu Verma first met Arjun Sarja on the sets of Champion (2000). This film marks the Bollywood debut of Bianca Desai. The film was shot in Talakona. A kissing scene was removed when the film was certified by the Central Board of Film Certification after fourteen cuts. The film was awarded an 'A' certificate.

Soundtrack 
Amitabh Bachchan attended the film's audio launch. Tinu Verma had worked as an action director for several of Amitabh Bachchan's films.

Reception 
A critic from SuperGoodMovies.com gave the film a rating of two out of five and opined that the film "was okay for Arjun fans". Rohit Ramachandran of Nowrunning.com gave the film a rating of one-half out of five stars and called the film "an act of raping cinema".

Box office 
The film released to no expectations and was a box office failure.

References 

2010s Hindi-language films
Indian thriller films
Films directed by Tinu Verma